EUR Fermi is a station on Line B of the Rome Metro. Opened in 1955, it is sited in the EUR between Viale America and Piazza della Stazione Enrico Fermi. Next to it is the artificial lake created for the 1960 Summer Olympics. The station's atrium houses mosaics which have won the Artemetro Roma prize by Bruno Ceccobelli (Italy) and Rupprecht Geiger (Germany).

Surroundings 
Central Archives of the State
PalaLottomatica
Laghetto dell'Eur
INAIL
Ministry of Infrastructure and Transport - HQ of Via dell'Arte
Viale America

References

External links 

ATAC

Rome Metro Line B stations
Railway stations opened in 1955
1955 establishments in Italy
Rome Q. XXXII Europa
Railway stations in Italy opened in the 20th century